José Manuel Velásquez Castillo (born 4 June 1952 in Lima) is a retired Peruvian footballer who played as a midfielder. Nicknamed "El Patrón", he stood out for his elegance, presence, courage and technical play, being recognized as one of the players with the most personality that Peruvian football has given and the best defensive midfielder in the history of his country. He was nominated for the Global Ballon d'Or by FIFA in 1977.

Famed for his elegance, leadership and technical game, along with Víctor Benítez he is recognised as one of Peru's most important defensive midfielders ever.

"El Patrón" was probably the best midfielder defensive player in South America between the late 1970s and early 1980s. He was a containment midfielder with an enormous defensive display, great passing game and strong personality that combined his dominant physical presence with a very technical and elegant game. He formed with Alianza Lima debuting in 1971 at the age of 17 as a central defender, although he was soon positioned in the midfield and became one of the greatest "blue and white" leaders, winning the Peruvian Primera División and integrating one of the best teams in the club's history during the two-time championship in 1977 and 1978. In 1979 he emigrated to Colombia to join Independiente Medellín, in which he coincided with his compatriot Hugo Sotil, and then he also went through the Toronto Blizzard and Hercules of the Spanish First Division.

He was a member of the  Peruvian team that won the 1975 Copa América and participated in the World Cup in Argentina 1978, where he reached the quarterfinals of final and Spain 1982 where it was important in the qualifiers to eliminate Uruguay and Colombia.

Club career 
At club level he played for Alianza Lima in Peru, where he was part of three league championship winning campaigns (1975, 1977 & 1978). He also played for Independiente Medellín of Colombia, Hércules CF of Spain and Deportes Iquique of Chile.

International career 
Nicknamed "El Patrón", he played for the Peru national football team that won the Copa América in 1975 and competed at the 1978 and 1982 FIFA World Cup, wearing the number six jersey. He played a total of 82 games for Peru between 1972 and 1985, scoring 12 goals.

International goals 
Scores and results table. Peru's goal tally first:

Honours

Club 
 Alianza Lima
Peruvian League: 1975, 1977, 1978

International 
 Peru national football team
Copa América: 1975

References

External links
International statistics at rsssf
  
Profile Toronto Blizzard

1952 births
Living people
Footballers from Lima
Peruvian footballers
Peru international footballers
1975 Copa América players
1978 FIFA World Cup players
1982 FIFA World Cup players
Copa América-winning players
Association football defenders
Club Alianza Lima footballers
Independiente Medellín footballers
Toronto Blizzard (1971–1984) players
Hércules CF players
Deportes Iquique footballers
Expatriate footballers in Colombia
Expatriate soccer players in Canada
Expatriate footballers in Spain
Expatriate footballers in Chile
Peruvian Primera División players
La Liga players
Peruvian expatriate footballers
Peruvian expatriate sportspeople in Canada
Peruvian expatriate sportspeople in Chile
Peruvian expatriate sportspeople in Colombia
Peruvian expatriate sportspeople in Spain
North American Soccer League (1968–1984) players